"Sing High, Sing Low" is a single by Canadian country pop artist Anne Murray. It was the first single from her album Straight, Clean and Simple. In early 1971, it peaked at number 1 on the RPM Country Tracks chart as well as the Canadian Adult Contemporary chart.

The song was a minor hit in the U.S., reaching number 53 on the Billboard Hot Country Singles chart and number 21 AC.

Chart performance

References

1971 singles
Anne Murray songs
1971 songs